Miguel Álvaro Santiago Domínguez (born 23 February 1949), sometimes known as just Santi, is a former Spanish professional footballer who played as a defender.

Santiago started his career en CF Valdepeñas, and joined to Segunda División club CE Sabadell FC on 1973. He retired as footballer at the end of 1980–81 season.

References

1949 births
Living people
Sportspeople from the Province of Almería
Footballers from Andalusia
Spanish footballers
Association football defenders
Segunda División players
Tercera División players
Terrassa FC footballers
CE Sabadell FC footballers